MKVToolNix is a collection of tools for the Matroska media container format by Moritz Bunkus including mkvmerge. The free and open source Matroska libraries and tools are available for various platforms including Linux and BSD distributions, macOS and Microsoft Windows. The tools can be also downloaded from video software distributors and FOSS repositories.

Applications 
MKVToolNix was reviewed by the Linux Journal, Linux Format, the ICTE Journal, and Softpedia among others. The tools are cited in patents for a "Universal container for audio data". A "portable" Windows edition exists, but is not  available in the PortableApps format.

Components 
MKVToolNix GUI is a Qt GUI for mkvmerge and a successor of mmg.
mkvmerge merges multimedia streams into a Matroska file.
mkvinfo lists all elements contained in a Matroska file.
mkvextract extracts specific parts from a Matroska file to other formats.
mkvpropedit allows to analyze and modify some Matroska file properties.

See also 

 Converting video on Wikimedia Commons
 List of open-source codecs

References

External links 

mkvtoolnix project on GitLab

Free multimedia software
Software that was ported from wxWidgets to Qt
Video software that uses Qt
Free software programmed in C++